Earl F. Shannon (November 23, 1921 – July 8, 2002) was an American professional basketball player and college coach. He played for the Providence Steamrollers of the Basketball Association of America for three seasons, before being released by the team in 1949 and signing with the Boston Celtics. In three seasons as a player he averaged 8.6 points and 1.3 assists per game.

In one year as Bryant University's head coach (1963–64), the program's first-ever season, the Bulldogs went 12–11. In other coaching roles he served as the University of Rhode Island's freshman basketball coach and an assistant on Providence College's varsity men's basketball squad.

Shannon was also an agent for the Federal Bureau of Investigation.

BAA career statistics

Regular season

Head coaching record

References

External links
 Earl Shannon's Hall of Fame entry @ the University of Rhode Island
 Earl Shannon's obituary

1921 births
2002 deaths
American Basketball League (1925–1955) players
American men's basketball players
Basketball coaches from Rhode Island
Basketball players from Rhode Island
Boston Celtics players
Bryant Bulldogs men's basketball coaches
Guards (basketball)
Federal Bureau of Investigation agents
Players of American football from Rhode Island
Providence Friars men's basketball coaches
Providence Steamrollers players
Rhode Island Rams baseball players
Rhode Island Rams football players
Rhode Island Rams men's basketball coaches
Rhode Island Rams men's basketball players
Sportspeople from Providence, Rhode Island